Clarinet Concerto No. 2 may refer to:

 Clarinet Concerto No. 2 (Arnold)
 Clarinet Concerto No. 2 (Weber)